Maria Chiara Ramorino (born 13 April 1931) is an Italian orienteer and a former tennis player.

Biography
She won two medals at the Summer Universiade. After her tennis career she became a proponent of the sport of Orienteering, and in 2008 wrote also a book of this theme.

She was also a scientist, among the researchers who participated to the first italian missions to Antarctica in the early 1990s, and manager of the Italian team that compiled and promulgated the SCAR Composite Gazetteer of Antarctica, 1998-2006.
The Ramorino Glacier in Antarctica was named after her in 2006 by US-ACAN.

Achievements

References

External links
  Athlete profile at FISO web site

1931 births
Living people
Italian female tennis players
Universiade medalists in tennis
Italian orienteers
Female orienteers
Universiade gold medalists for Italy
Medalists at the 1959 Summer Universiade